Ratan Singh Jatav was an M.P. from Bharatpur constituency (15th constituency) in Rajasthan. His educational qualification is B.E. He is elected from Indian National Congress political party. He is constituted as M.P. first time in 2009 elections.

References

External links
View here detailed Profile of the MP

Rajasthani politicians
India MPs 2009–2014
People from Bharatpur district
Living people
1947 births
Lok Sabha members from Rajasthan